Parthian may be:

Historical
 A demonym "of Parthia", a region of north-eastern of Greater Iran
 Parthian Empire (247 BC – 224 AD)
 Parthian language, a now-extinct Middle Iranian language
 Parthian shot, an archery skill famously employed by Parthian horsemen

Other uses
 Parthian Books, a Welsh publishing house
 Indo-Parthian Kingdoms
 Parthian-class submarine
 Seven Parthian clans

See also
 Parthia (disambiguation)
 Pahlavi (disambiguation)

Language and nationality disambiguation pages